Round Lick was a community in Wilson County, Tennessee, USA, along Round Lick Creek. The creek runs through the eastern part of the county, through the communities of Commerce and Watertown. The Round Lick community of neighboring families lay between the two present towns. In the early to mid-19th century, numerous families migrated from there to southern Arkansas, seeking areas where land was more plentiful for farming.

Early settlers
On Round Lick Creek including Jennings Fork: John W. Peyton, Arthur Hankins, James Wrather, Samuel King, William Haines, John Bradley, William McSpeddin, William Coe, Abner Spring, William Harris, Jophn Phillips, Benjamin Phillips, Edward G. Jacobs, John Green, Samuel Barton, Alexander Beard, Jordan Bass, Solomon Bass, John Lawrence, Evans Tracy, Joseph Barbee, Shelah Waters, George Clarke, James Shelton, William Neal, Joshua Taylor, Isaac Grandstaff, Daniel Smith, Jacob Vantrease, Duncan Johnson, Joseph Foust, James Hill, Joseph Carlin, George Hearn, John Patton, John Bradley, William New, Robert Branch, James Edwards, William Howard, Edmund Jennings, John White, John Swan, Thomas Byles, William Palmer, Park Goodall, Jerre Brown, Thomas B. Reece, James Scoby, James Hobbs, James Newbey (i.e., Newby) and John Caplinger.  (Goodspeed, 1886) (Coley 1971)

References

Ghost towns in Tennessee
Geography of Wilson County, Tennessee